Dário de Castro (28 November 1948 – 15 April 2021) was a Brazilian voice actor and voice director. Castro was known for dubbing the parts of actors like Russell Crowe and Liam Neeson.

Life and career
Castro acted in works such as Pocahontas, The Hunchback of Notre Dame and Justice League. He died at the age of 72, in Rio de Janeiro due to complications from COVID-19.

References

External links
 

1948 births
2021 deaths
Brazilian male film actors
Brazilian male television actors
Brazilian male voice actors
Deaths from the COVID-19 pandemic in Rio de Janeiro (state)
Male actors from Rio de Janeiro (city)
20th-century Brazilian male actors
21st-century Brazilian male actors